You Are on Indian Land is a 1969 documentary film directed by Mike Kanentakeron Mitchell about the 1969 Akwesasne border crossing dispute and the confrontation between police and Mohawk of the St. Regis Reservation on a bridge between Canada and the United States, which stands on Mohawk land near Cornwall, Ontario.

By blocking traffic from the bridge, the Mohawk sought to call attention to their grievance that they were prohibited by Canadian authorities from duty-free passage of personal purchases across the border.  They claimed this right as part of their right of free passage across the border, as established by the 1794 Jay Treaty between Great Britain and the United States after the latter gained independence in the American Revolutionary War. The film portrayed the rising activism of the Mohawk and demands for self-determination, which has continued.

Production
You Are on Indian Land was produced by the National Film Board of Canada (NFB) as part of its Challenge for Change series, with Mitchell a member of the fledgling Indian Film Crew for First Nations filmmaking. Knowing that negotiations were faltering and that Mohawks here planning to block the bridge, Mitchell asked George C. Stoney, the Challenge for Change executive producer, for an NFB film crew. Stoney moved quickly to pull a film team together. Director Mort Ransen agreed to work on the project after learning that no First Nations directors were available, saying that he would assist Mitchell.

For Mitchell, who would go on to become a long-serving Grand Chief of Akwesasne, the experience of making You Are on Indian Land blurred the lines between filmmaking and politics:

Crediting changes
In 2016, an encounter between Ransen and NFB English Program executive director Michelle van Beusekom at the DOXA Documentary Film Festival led to series of discussions that would see the NFB officially recredit the film with Mitchell as director, in accordance with Ransen's longtime wishes. Additionally, Indian Film Crew member Noel Starblanket would be added as assistant editor for his work alongside editor Kathleen Shannon, the future founder of Studio D. Regarding the crediting issue, Mitchell said:

Aftermath
Afterward, Mitchell worked with the NFB for several more years before leaving filmmaking. He was elected to the Mohawk Council of Akwesasne in 1982.  Two years later, he was first elected as its Grand Chief—an office he would repeatedly hold, beginning in 1984 until his most recent reelection in 2012.

References

Works cited

External links
You Are on Indian Land, may be viewed at National Film Board of Canada website (requires Adobe Flash)

Documentary films about First Nations
1969 films
Akwesasne
Documentary films about Indigenous rights in Canada
National Film Board of Canada documentaries
Black-and-white documentary films
Documentary films about Native Americans
Mohawk culture
Cornwall, Ontario
Customs duties
Canada–United States border
1969 documentary films
1960s Canadian films